The flag of the Tajik Soviet Socialist Republic was the red Soviet flag with white and green stripes below the gold hammer and sickle, with the measures: 1/2 red, 1/5 white, 1/10 green, 1/5 red. The flag sported the Pan-Iranian colors of red, white and green, as a nod to the republic's Persian-descended culture. The flag was adopted on March 20, 1953 by decree of the Supreme Soviet of the Tajik SSR: 

The red represents the unity of the republic and the aspect of workers' revolution, white symbolized cotton production, the basis of Tajik agriculture, and the green was for other agricultural produce.

After 1953, the flag received a unique reverse side. The reverse side of the flag was the same as the obverse with the exception of it lacking the yellow hammer and sickle. In 1991, after Tajikistan became an independent country, the reverse side was used as the national flag until a new flag was created and adopted in 1992.

Historical flags

The first specifically Tajik flag was introduced in 1929. Before that, Tajikistan had been part of the Bukharan SSR (partly transferred to the Turkestan SSR in 1924); before the Russian revolution it had been part of the Emirate of Bukhara (since 1873 a protectorate of the Russian Empire).

Following independence on September 9, 1991, the reverse side of the Tajik SSR flag remained in use as the Tajik national flag until a new Tajik flag was adopted in November 1992, becoming the last post-Soviet country to receive a completely new flag.

See also

 Flag of the Soviet Union
 Coat of arms of the Tajik SSR
 Flag of Tajikistan

References

Tajik Soviet Socialist Republic
National symbols of Tajikistan
Tajik Soviet Socialist Republic